The chestnut-throated seedeater (Sporophila telasco) is Neotropical songbird in the family Thraupidae.

It is found in along the western seaboard of South America, from southwestern Colombia to far northern Chile.

The natural habitats of the chestnut-throated seedeater are subtropical or tropical dry shrubland, subtropical or tropical moist shrubland, swamps, sandy shores, and heavily degraded former forest along the pacific coast and montane uplands of Western South America, primarily Ecuador, Peru and Chile.

The species serves as an indicator of declining forest health, as their populations appear to increase following deforestation and land use change.
Males possess a rich chestnut patch on the throat in breeding season, while females share a similar color pattern, but lack the throat patch, with a lighter bill, but moult into drab plumage outside of the breeding season. This occurs because the cost of predator attracting, colorful plumage is no longer worth taking when breeding activities are completed.

These songbirds are among the smallest members of the tanager family at approximately 4.0 inches in length, and possess powerful bills to harvest grass seeds.

References

chestnut-throated seedeater
Birds of Ecuador
Birds of Peru
Western South American coastal birds
chestnut-throated seedeater
Taxonomy articles created by Polbot